"Every Little Thing I Do" is the second single from R&B group Soul for Real's first album, Candy Rain. Eldest brother Chris (aka Choc) sings lead. While it was not as big a hit as "Candy Rain", it reached number 11 on the Billboard R&B chart and number 17 on the Billboard Hot 100. The song samples "Outstanding" by the Gap Band. The single was certified Gold by the RIAA for selling over 500,000 copies in the United States on October 25, 1995. In 2018, Jase, the lead singer of Soul for Real, featured his brother Choc on a remake of the song on his solo recording project called "If You Feel Like Me: The Mixtape". The song is written and recorded in the key of G minor.

Music video
Directed by Brett Ratner, the video takes place in a club complete with a bar, roller rink and a rotating platform where the group is performing on. R&B girl group Total, rap group and former labelmates the Lost Boyz and their former boss the late Heavy D, make cameo appearances in the video.

Charts

Weekly charts

Year-end charts

References

1994 songs
1995 singles
Music videos directed by Brett Ratner
Uptown Records singles
Songs written by Samuel Barnes (songwriter)
Songs written by Jean-Claude Olivier
Songs written by Heavy D
Soul for Real songs